Raúl Machacuay (born 18 February 1983) is a Peruvian long distance runner who specialises in the marathon. He competed in the men's marathon event at the 2016 Summer Olympics held in Rio de Janeiro, Brazil. In 2017, he competed in the men's marathon event at the 2017 World Championships in Athletics held in London, England.

References

External links
 

1983 births
Living people
Peruvian male long-distance runners
Peruvian male marathon runners
Athletes (track and field) at the 2016 Summer Olympics
Olympic athletes of Peru
World Athletics Championships athletes for Peru
People from Huancayo